Jamke Cheema is one of the largest Town  and a union council in the Daska Tehsil, Sialkot District of Punjab, Pakistan. The Town is about 8 kilometres from Daska and is located on the west bank of Marala Ravi Link Canal.

The town is About 17km from Sialkot punjab pakistan.
The area of ​​Jamke Cheema is 3963 square acres and the population is 28603 according to the 2017 census.

References

Villages in Sialkot District
Union councils of Sialkot District